Phillip Harden Dean (13 October 1913 – 23 August 1982) was a former Australian rules footballer who played with Melbourne in the Victorian Football League (VFL).

Notes

External links 

1913 births
1982 deaths
Australian rules footballers from Tasmania
Melbourne Football Club players
Launceston Football Club players